is a train station located in Nakafurano, Hokkaidō, Japan. It is operated by the Hokkaido Railway Company.

The station opens only on selected dates in year and only selected trains stop at the station.

Lines serviced
Furano Line

Surrounding Area
  Route 237
 Farm Tomita

Sources

Railway stations in Hokkaido Prefecture
Railway stations in Japan opened in 1999